Destino (Destiny) is a Mexican telenovela produced by Maricarmen Marcos for Azteca. Paola Nuñez and Mauricio Islas star as the protagonists.

Plot
Destino narrates a story where both mother and daughter fall in love with the same man.

History
From April 8 to August 30, 2013, Azteca 13 aired Destino weeknights at 7:30pm. Production officially started on March 7, 2013.

Cast
 Margarita Gralia as Grecia Del Sol/Dulce María 
 Paola Núñez as Valeria Gonzalez / Valeria Cabrales Ríos 
 Mauricio Islas as Sebastian Montesinos 
 Ana La Salvia as Andrea Urdaneta Ramos 
 Maria Fernanda Quiroz as Jennifer Fernandez "La Jennifer"
 Maria José Magan as Elena Vargas Del Sol
 Lucía Leyba as Cristina Vargas Del Sol 
 Javier Gómez as Rolando Vargas Montero
 Ana Karina Guevara as Soledad Dominguez
 Hugo Catalán as Juan Beltrán "El Morro"  
 Jorge Luis Vázquez as Héctor Nava
 Juan Vidal as Germán Aguirre de Alba
 Erick Chapa as Iñaki Herrera
 Araceli Aguilar as Elizabeth Ramos de Urdaneta
 Álvaro Guerrero as Venustiano Cabrales 
 Homero Wimmer as Juan José "Padre Juanjo" Reyes Castillo
 Alessandra Pozo as Nuría
 María José Arce as Camila Montesinos Urdaneta
 Socorro Miranda as Ángela Ruiz de Cosio 
 Jorge Reyes as Jimenez 
 Tamara Fascovich as Guadalupe "Lupita"
 Eugenio Montessoro as Víctor Urdaneta
 Carilo Navarro as Rosa
 Pilar Fernandez as Jazmín
 Mauricio Bonet as Comandante Antonio Cantú
 Arancha as Agente Patricia Cabazos
 Paulette Hernández as Pamela Urdaneta Ramos
 Luisa Garza as Socorro González 
 Matias Aranda as Diego
 Adrián Rubio as Enrique Valencia 
 Emmanuel Morales as El Pelón 
 Luis Morales as Don Aselmo "Chemo"
 Miguel Ángel Ferriz

References 

Mexican telenovelas
2013 Mexican television series debuts
2013 telenovelas
TV Azteca telenovelas
2013 Mexican television series endings
Mexican television series based on Venezuelan television series
Spanish-language telenovelas